And None of Them Knew They Were Robots (stylized as ...And None of Them Knew They Were Robots and also known as the Robots) were an English hardcore punk band from Leeds formed in 2000. In 2001, Francis, Hall and Dobbins began playing in crossover thrash band Send More Paramedics.

History
The band was formed in 2000 by former members of pre-existing Leeds punk rock bands. In 2001, they released their debut self-titled album through Pigdog Records. In 2002, they released their second album, titled Liebestod, which saw a departure from their prior sound into regular hardcore punk, because of this, members and fans sometimes refer to it as the "Hardcore EP". In 2003, they released the EP Victory as a Drug through Jealous Records, which saw them return to their sound prior to Liebestod. On 1 August 2003, they played Out Of Spite Festival at Josephs Well. For the rest of August, they toured the U.K. for their final headline tour prior their breakup. For Out of Spite festival 2007, they reformed a single performance. In 2016, they reformed for the release of their discography compilation and a U.K. headline tour.

Musical style and legacy
The band have been categorised as emo post-hardcore and indie rock. Their 2002 album Liebestod showed a style closer to that of '80s Washington D.C. hardcore punk. Their music was influenced by Sunny Day Real Estate, Planes Mistaken for Stars, Cave In, Braid, Fugazi, Hot Water Music, Small Brown Bike, Les Savy Fav and At The Drive-In. In an article for Brainwashed, Graeme Rowland described them as "Rites of Spring mixed up with a more melodic Drive Like Jehu parts". They have influenced the sounds of ¡Forward, Russia!, This Et Al, The Lucida Console, Crash of Rhinos and Box Social.

Members
Kevin McGonnell – lead vocals, guitar
Duncan Hall – guitar
Sam Francis – bass
Stuart Dobbins – drums

Discography
Albums
And None of Them Knew They Were Robots (2001)
Liebestod (2002)

EPs
Victory as a Drug (2003)

Compilations
Discography (2016)

References

Hardcore punk groups from Leeds
Indie rock groups from Leeds
British emo musical groups
British post-hardcore musical groups
Musical groups established in 2000
Musical groups reestablished in 2007
Musical groups reestablished in 2016
Musical groups disestablished in 2003
Musical groups disestablished in 2007
Musical groups disestablished in 2016